Lee Kershaw (born 2 May 1999) is a professional rugby league footballer who plays as a er for Wakefield Trinity in the Super League.

He has spent time on loan from Wakefield at Oldham (Heritage № 1396) in Betfred League 1 and the Championship.

Career
In 2019 Kershaw made his Super League début for Trinity against the Leeds Rhinos.

References

External links
Wakefield Trinity profile
SL profile

1999 births
Living people
English rugby league players
Oldham R.L.F.C. players
Rugby league wingers
Wakefield Trinity players